Batrachospermales is an order of red algae.

References

 
Red algae orders